Sailly may refer to the following places in France:

Sailly, Ardennes, a commune in the Ardennes department 
Sailly, Haute-Marne, a commune in the Haute-Marne department 
Sailly, Saône-et-Loire, a commune in the Saône-et-Loire department 
Sailly, Yvelines, a commune in the Yvelines department
Sailly-Laurette, a commune in the Somme department in Hauts-de-France
Sailly-le-Sec, a commune in the Somme department in Hauts-de-France
Sailly-Achâtel, a commune in the Moselle department in Grand Est

ru:Сайи